Issa Marega (born 20 April 1998) is a French professional footballer who plays as a centre-back and midfielder.

Career
On 29 May 2018, Marega signed his first professional contract with Stade Malherbe Caen.

On 22 January 2019, Marega joined Cercle Brugge. He made his professional debut with Cercle Brugge in a 3–2 Belgian First Division A loss to  Zulte Waregem on 2 February 2019.

Personal life
Born in France, Marega is of Senegalese  descent.

References

External links

1998 births
Living people
People from Sèvres
French footballers
French people of Malian descent
Association football defenders
Association football midfielders
Cercle Brugge K.S.V. players
LB Châteauroux players
Belgian Pro League players
Championnat National 3 players
Ligue 2 players
French expatriate footballers
French expatriate sportspeople in Belgium
Expatriate footballers in Belgium